José Tomás de la Luz Mejía Camacho, better known as Tomás Mejía (September 17, 1820 – June 19, 1867), was a Mexican soldier of Otomi background, who consistently sided with the Conservative Party throughout its nineteenth century conflicts with the Liberals. 

Mejía  was one of the leading conservative commanders during the War of Reform and during the Second French Intervention in Mexico which established the Second Mexican Empire. He became known for repeatedly using the Sierra Gorda, which he was familiar with since childhood, as his base of operations. After the fall of the empire, Mejía  was executed on June 19, 1867, alongside Emperor Maximilian, and fellow conservative commander Miguel Miramon.

Early Life
Little is known about Mejía ’s childhood, but he was likely born in Pinal de Amoles, Sierra Gorda, Querétaro. He attended the primary school of the Villa del Jalpan. 

His father Cristobal Mejía  was from 1840 to 1842 prefect of the Jalpan district. This was during the Centralist Republic of Mexico when Mexico had been divided into departments, and during which there were many rebellions in favor of states rights which sought to restore the federalist system by which Mexico had previously been governed. One such revolt in 1840 had been led by José de Urrea, who defeated, then found himself in Jalpan by 1841, where Cristobal Mejía harbored Urrea in his home. The young Tomás  Mejía  met Urrea and the latter told him war stories and encouraged him in his wishes to join the military.

Early Military Career
Government forces led by Juan Cano then arrived in Jalpan, and Mejía  enlisted in the army right there and then. Cano was impressed by the prefect’s son, and his talent for horse riding, writing a letter of recommendation to President Anastasio Bustamante so that Mejía  could be admitted to the Military Academy in Mexico City. 

Mejía ’s first tour of service would be as part of Apache–Mexico Wars, during which he was stationed at Chihuahua City and fought against the Apache from 1842 to 1845. For his service he was promoted in ranks.

Mexican American War
After the United States annexed Texas, and tensions between Mexico and the U.S. were leading to war, Mejía  formed part of the Army of the North sent to patrol the Mexican frontier. He was transferred from Chihuahua to Monterrey.  After the American invasion began, Mejía  followed the Mexican army as it fell back, and he saw action at the Battle of Angostura. 

The American northern advance under Zachary Taylor stalled after the Battle of Buena Vista, and after the bulk of the Mexican army was called back to the capital to face Winfield Scott’s expedition from the East, Mejía  was made part of a garrison that was ordered to stay in the north at San Luis Potosi where he would remain until the end of the war. In 1849, he was granted the rank of commander.  

In 1850 during the presidency of Mariano Arista, a revolt flared up in the Sierra Gorda led by the rebel Quiros, and Mejía  was among the troops sent to pacify the region. The operation was a success and Quiros was executed at the end of the year.  The region had long been a source of instability and president Mariano Arista began to plan a series of military colonies to help maintain order in the region. Mejía  was made military commander of the region, but the colonization project was interrupted when the Arista administration was overthrown in 1853 and replaced by Santa Anna. Nonetheless Mejía  maintained his post as the region’s political administrator 

The liberal Plan of Ayutla was proclaimed against Santa Anna in 1854, but Mejía  remained loyal to the government, and crushed a local revolt. The Plan of Ayutla however continued to gain adherents. The governor of Queretaro, Mejía ’s superior, was overthrown, and Mejía  attempted to join a counter-revolt, which however surrendered to the government Mejía  would find himself pardoned by the new liberal government.

La Reforma

The Plan of Ayutla would triumph and result in the liberal Juan Álvarez coming to power. Under his administration would begin a series of reforms known as La Reforma which would include a new constitution, and among which were anti-clerical measures intended to strip the Catholic Church of its legal privileges and wealth. 

On June 25, 1856, under the presidency of Ignacio Comonfort, the Ley Lerdo was passed, nationalizing lands which were legally held communally. The measure stripped both the Catholic Church and Mexico’s Indigenous communities of the land that they owned, and it was intended to break up the land and sell it to individual owners, under the assumption that this would lead to economic development. 

Amidst nationwide conservative revolts, on October 13, Mejía  took over the town of Queretaro, proclaiming his defense of the church and also promising the Indigenous communities to protect their communal lands which had also been affected by the Ley Lerdo. The government sent General Manuel Doblado to take back the city, and Mejía  was forced to evacuate it on October 21, heading towards the Sierra Gorda.  

Mejía  was now dedicated to waging guerilla warfare while staying based in the Sierra Gorda. General Vicente Rosas Landa attempted to reach a compromise with Mejía , and offered official government recognition of his rank, an arranagment which President Comonfort opposed. Negotiations fell apart, and Mejía  went back to the Sierra.

Reform War
The revolts against La Reforma would develop into full blown civil war after President Comonfort joined Félix María Zuloaga's Plan of Ayutla, amounting to a self coup, and which proposed to draft a new, more moderate constitution. Comonfort later backed out of the plan, and left the capital. The constitutional presidency now passed on to the president of the Supreme Court Benito Juarez, while a conservative junta declared Zuloaga to be president. States began to split ther allegiances among the rival governments. By April, 1858, the liberal Juarez government was esconced in Veracruz, while the conservative government remained in Mexico City. On January, 1859, the conservatives chose Miguel Miramon as their new president. 

Mejía  joined Miguel Miramon to occupy the city of San Luis Potosi on September 13, 1858, and they defeated the liberal general Santiago Vidaurri on September 29  

In April, 1859, Mejía  was among the conservative troops falling back upon Mexico City where they routed liberal troops under the command of Santos Degollado. On April 12 Mejía  participated in a Mexico City celebration regarding the victory.  

On April 19, Mejía  and Marquez were dispatched with a strong army to operate in the state of Michoacan.  

The tide of the war began to turn against the conservatives in 1860. Miramon had already failed to capture the liberal capital of Veracruz and another attempt in July of that year failed due to the intervention of the United States Navy. Miramon retreated back to Mexico City as liberal forces closed in on the capital. 

Mejía  was present at the Battle of Silao at August 10 at which the conservatives were routed. Miramon then retreated to Mexico City.  The liberals finally captured Mexico City on January, 1861. Mejía  was at Queretaro when the conservative government fell, and he escaped afterwards to the Sierra Gorda.

Between the Wars

Mejía  now found himself in the city of Jalpan, where he attempted to continue the conservative revolt. He succeeded in capturing the city of Rio Verde and took the garrison commander, Mariano Escobedo prisoner. False stories that Escobedo had been shot circulated in the press, but in reality, Mejía  had let him go.  Curiously enough, Escobedo would one day be the same commander that would capture Mejía  during the Siege of Queretaro, and which would result in Mejía 's execution. 

After taking Rio Verde's war supplies, Mejía  returned to Jalpan where he joined his forces with those of Leonardo Marquez, the military head of the surviving conservative movement and Ramón Méndez to form an army of about two thousand.  Marquez reprimanded Mejía  for not having shot Escobedo, warning him that Escobedo would one day in turn have him shot, words that would in the end prove prophetic. 

The government sent troops under Manuel Doblado to Jalpan, but Mejía  defeated him in multiple skirmishes, before utterly routing him at Cuesta del Huizache, causing Doblado to retreat from the Sierra Gorda. 

Mejía  remained stationed at Jalpan, while Marquez went on to notable successes, managing to kill the liberal generals Santos Degollado and Leandro Valle. 

On May Mejía  briefly occupied Queretaro City and around the same time President Benito Juarez placed a bounty on Mejía 's head amounting to 10,000 pesos.  

Mejía  left Queretaro and the Sierra Gorda, heading towards the state of Hidalgo where on July 5, he attacked the city of Huichapan taking all of its garrison prisoner.  He then fell back upon the Sierra Gorda to join the rest of the conservative forces which had failed in an attack on Mexico City.

Second French Intervention

In July of 1861, President Juarez suspended foreign debt payments in response to a financial crisis, and on October 31 the convention of London, saw Spain, Great Britain, and France, agreeing to militarily intervene in Mexico for the sake of pledging Mexico to pay its debts. 

On December 14, 1861, a Spanish fleet sailed into and took possession of the port of Veracruz. The city was occupied on the 17. French and English forces arrived on January 7, 1862. On January 10 a manifesto was issued by Spanish General Juan Prim disavowing rumors that the allies had come to conquer or to impose a new government. It was emphasized that the three powers merely wanted to open negotiations regarding their claims of damages. On April 17, 1862, Juan Almonte, who had been a foreign minister of the conservative government during the Reform War, and who was brought back to Mexico by the French, released his own manifesto, assuring the Mexican people of benevolent French intentions.
Zuloaga and Marquez decided to join Almonte, but Mejía , who was reluctant to fight for the Spanish, took on an attitude of wait and see. 

Meanwhile Spain and Great Britain had come to agreements with the Juarez government and departed Mexico as they learned that France intended to overthrow the Mexican government and replace it with a monarchy. On May, 5, 1862 Charles de Lorencez's small expeditionary force was repulsed at the Battle of Puebla, and the French army retreated to Orizaba to await reinforcements. 

Mejía  was meanwhile based in Queretaro, and he published a newspaper expressing his opinions on the ongoing war. Like other conservatives, he did not believe that the French threatened Mexico’s independence, and by October, he openly supported the establishment of the Second Mexican Empire with Maximilian of Habsburg, as its monarch. 

By June, 1863, the capital had fallen and a conservative, Mexican government had been installed by the French upon which Mejía  headed to the capital to offer his services.

Second Mexican Empire
In Mexico City he was received warmly by Marshal Forey, then commander in chief of the French forces in Mexico, who resupplied Mejía s troops.  Mejía  was then given military command over the interior of the nation. 

Mejía  was present at the opening of the Assembly of Notables in July, which resolved to found a monarchy and invite Maximilian of Habsburg to assume the throne. 

Mejía  now took part in the military campaigns by Franco-Mexican forces to consolidate control of the rest of the nation. On December 25, he captured the city of San Luis Potosi. Two days later liberal forces under Miguel Negrete attempted to take back the city only to be utterly routed, losing all of their war material and leaving nine hundred prisoners. The defeat also resulted in the voluntary surrender of the liberal generals Aramberri, Parrodi, and Ampudia.

In January, 1864 Mejía  was transferred to Matehuala. In May liberal forces under Manuel Doblado attempted to take the town, only to suffer a decisive defeat at the hands of Mejía , causing Doblado to leave the nation. Because of this victory, Napoleon III granted Mejía  the cross of the Legion of Honor

On June 12, Mejía  was present at the National Palace at the official reception for the arrival of the royal couple. He was appointed spokesman by the Knights of Guadalupe, and Emperor Maximilian embraced Mejía . 

For the second half of 1864, Mejía  was stationed in the northeast of the nation working to pacify the region with Charles-Louis Du Pin and Édouard Aymard. 

The tide of the Empire began to turn with the end of the U.S. Civil War in April, 1865, after which the United States began to supply Mexican Republican forces, and put pressure on France to leave the continent. The Republican General Negrete, with some American mercenaries, began to capture towns along the Rio Grande, and Mejía  retreated to Matamoros to await reinforcements.  

Mejía  protested to the American commandant at Clarksville that American aid and troops was being given to Republican forces, but the commandant replies that such men did so on their own behalf and not on that of the United States government.  In spite of that, another American raid cause the U.S. government to remove the commandant from his post and to reprimand the soldiers involved. 

As the Empire began to falter, Mejía  was forced to retreat from Matamoros on June 23, 1866, and withdraw to Vera Cruz.  By December of that year he and his troops found themselves at Guanajuato.  By January, 1867, French troops had evacuated Mexico.  Imperialist forces while retaining control of Mexico City, began to consolidate at Queretaro, where the Emperor and his leading generals, including Mejía , now found themselves. 

At a council of war on February 22, 1867, Mejía  opposed Marquez’ notion to retreat to Mexico City.   On March 12, republican forces commanded by Mariano Escobedo finally appeared at Queretaro. 

The Imperialists held out the siege for the time being and Mejía  played his role in repulsing the besieging republicans,  but after a few weeks of comabat, Mejía  was persuaded to support a plan of retreat, which was opposed by Miramon and ultimately not followed through by Maximilian.  On March 24, Mejía  once more repulsed another republican assault.  

Mejía  now fell ill, delaying Imperialist plans of attempting to break through the Republican lines Nonetheless Mejía  recovered enough to continue plans to escape and seek refuge in Mejía ’s old haunt, the Sierra Gorda, where he was well known and regarded amongst the population. 

Before the plan could be carried out, the gates to the town were opened by the Imperialist Colonel Miguel Lopez for a sum of gold. Mejía , and the rest of the imperial leadership were captured on May 15, 1867. Escobedo, whose life had been spared by Mejía  six years earlier offered Mejía  an escape, but he refused it unless he could be accompanied by Maximilian, and Miramon, terms which Escobedo found unacceptable.  

Mejía  was tried by a court martial at which he was defended by the lawyer Prospero Vega. The defense brought up that previously Mejía  had been merciful when capturing the enemy, sparing general Mariano Escobedo, and Jeronimo Trevino, but the court still sentenced Mejía  to death.  Mejía , Maximilian, and Miramon were shot by firing squad at dawn on June 19, 1867.

Decorations
Mejía was awarded Grand Cross of the Imperial Order of Guadalupe in 1864 and Grand Cross of the Imperial Order of the Mexican Eagle in 1865.

In 1865, Napoleon III granted him the cross of the Legion of Honor.

References

Sources
Hamnett, Brian. "Mexican Conservatives, Clericals and Soldiers: the 'Traitor' Tomás Mejía through Reform and Empire, 1855-1867." Bulletin of Latin American Research 20, no. 2 (2001): 187–209.

External links

1820 births
1867 deaths
Indigenous Mexicans
Mexican generals
Mexican monarchists
Mexican military personnel of the Mexican–American War
Executed Mexican people
People executed by Mexico by firing squad
People executed for treason against Mexico
Executed military personnel
Politicians from Querétaro
Second French intervention in Mexico
Governors of Querétaro
Conservatism in Mexico
Military personnel from Querétaro
19th-century Mexican politicians
19th-century Mexican military personnel